Secret Eaters is a British documentary television series about overeating. It is broadcast on Channel 4 and presented by Anna Richardson. There have so far been 22 episodes spanning three series. In each episode, Anna Richardson meets a group of people; usually a couple, friends or a family, who are overweight. They are then filmed in their homes for a week and followed around by 'private investigators' Cameron Gowlett and Duncan Mee who monitor their every move and record everything they eat. At the end of the week, they are confronted by the presenter about what they eat, shown footage of them eating and told how many calories they have eaten throughout the course of the week. They are also given dietary advice by expert Lynne Garton about what they have eaten.

Series 1

Episode 1: Jill and Stuart 
Air date - 16 May 2012

Siblings Jill Hamill and Stuart Raphael in the Wirral.

Episode 2: The Castle family 
Air date - 23 May 2012

The Castles from Welwyn Garden City.

Episode 3: Dawn, Mike and Gareth 
Air date - 30 May 2012

Episode 4: The Meakin family 
Air date - 6 June 2012

Episode 5: The White Olivers 
Air date - 13 June 2012

Episode 6: Ronnie and Stuart 
Air date - 20 June 2012

Series 2

Episode 1: Ray and Ange 
Air date - 8 April 2013

Episode 2: Emma and Paul 
Air date - 15 April 2013

Episode 3: David and Denise 
Air date - 22 April 2013

Episode 4: Lauren and Stephanie 
Air date - 29 April 2013

Episode 5: Hetal and Mitul  
Air date - 6 May 2013

Episode 6: Daryl and Kate 
Air date - 13 May 2013

Episode 7: Emma and Matthew 
Air date - 20 May 2013

Episode 8: Prescious and Florence 
Air date - 27 May 2013

Series 3

Episode 1: Faye and Laura 
Air date - 12 March 2014

Episode 2: Helena and Murray 
Air date - 19 March 2014

Episode 3: Kelli and Tracey 
Air date - 26 March 2014

Episode 4: Sharon and Tracy 
Air date - 2 April 2014

Episode 5: Lorraine and Cori 
Air date - 9 April 2014

Episode 6: Glyn, Louise and Sue 
Air date - 16 April 2014

Episode 7: Michael and Katie 
Air date - 23 April 2014

Episode 8: Allan and Emma 
Air date - 30 April 2014

References

External links 

2012 British television series debuts
2014 British television series endings
2010s British documentary television series
English-language television shows
Channel 4 documentary series
Television series by Endemol